Norton is the given name of:

People
 Norton Bush (1834-1894), American landscape painter
 Norton Clapp (1906–1995), American businessman, chairman of the Weyerhaeuser Corporation
 Norton Garfinkle (born 1931), economist, businessman and public servant
 Norton Juster (1929-2021), American architect and author, best known for writing the children's book The Phantom Tollbooth
 Norton Knatchbull, various people
 Norton Mezvinsky (born 1932), American historian, professor, and author
 Norton Nascimento (1962–2007), Brazilian actor
 Norton A. Schwartz (born 1951), retired United States Air Force general and 19th Chief of Staff of the Air Force
 Norton Simon (1907–1993), American industrialist and philanthropist
 Norton Zinder (1928–2012), American biologist

Fictional characters
 Norton, protagonist of the fantasy novel Bearing an Hourglass
 Norton Nork, simpleton created by Sandy Becker
 Norton Campbell, a playable survivor in the chinese horror game Identity V.